Beto Mansur (born 1951) is a Brazilian politician and soybean farmer. He serves in the Congress and owns a soybean farm in Goiás.

References

Living people
1951 births
People from Salto, São Paulo
People from Goiás
Brazilian politicians
Brazilian farmers